The Namibia Hockey Union (NHU) is the governing body of field hockey in Namibia. It is affiliated to IHF International Hockey Federation and AHF African Hockey Federation. The Headquarter of the NHU are in windhoek, Namibia.

Executive Committee

History

See also
African Hockey Federation

References

External links
Namibia-FIH
Namibia-IIHF

Namibia
Hockey
Field hockey in Namibia